The Catholic Church in Iceland is part of the Catholic Church, under the spiritual leadership of the Pope. The island is served by a single diocese, the Diocese of Reykjavík. , the ordinary is bishop Dávid Bartimej Tencer. The diocese is directly subject to the Holy See.

Statistics
, there are 14,723 Catholics in Iceland, with 6 diocesan priests, 9 religious order priests, and 38 sisters in religious orders. Catholics represent 3.91% of the Icelandic population and are growing in number rapidly. The Diocese of Reykjavík covers the whole of Iceland. The diocese has a cathedral, Christ the King Cathedral (Dómkirkja Krists Konungs) in Reykjavík, and a number of smaller churches and chapels in the larger towns around the country.

History

Pre-Reformation
Some of the earliest inhabitants of Iceland were Irish monks, known as Papar. However, the small population was overwhelmed in the eighth and ninth centuries by migrations of Scandinavians, most of whom practised what can loosely be called Germanic paganism. Particularly through the influence of continental missionaries and pressure from the Norwegian king, Iceland officially converted in 999/1000 AD, but the Christianisation of Iceland, as with the rest of Scandinavia, was a long process, beginning before official conversion and continuing after it.

Before the Reformation, there were two dioceses in Iceland, the Diocese of Skálholt (first bishop, Ísleifur Gissurarson, 1056), and the Diocese of Hólar (first bishop, Bl. Jón Ögmundsson, 1106).

Reformation
During the Protestant Reformation, Iceland adopted Lutheranism in place of Catholicism. Two men, Oddur Gottskálksson and Gissur Einarsson, became disciples of Martin Luther and soon secured followers, particularly after King Christian III of Denmark and Norway declared himself for Lutheranism and began to enforce the change in his kingdom. This led to resistance and civil war on the island. Jón Arason and Ögmundur Pálsson, the Catholic bishops of Skálholt and Hólar respectively, opposed the king's efforts at promoting the Reformation in Iceland. Pálsson was deported by Danish officials in 1541, but Arason decided to fight. Opposition to the Reformation effectively ended in 1550 when Arason was captured after being defeated in the Battle of Sauðafell by royalist forces under Daði Guðmundsson. Arason and his two sons were subsequently beheaded in Skálholt on 7 November 1550.

As a consequence, Catholicism was outlawed and church property was appropriated by Iceland's rulers. Latin remained the official language of the Lutheran Church of Iceland until 1686. While a good part of Catholic terminology and other externals were retained, Lutheran teachings differed considerably from Catholic doctrine. Those Catholics who refused to convert were forced into exile. Most chose Scotland as their place of exile. Catholic clergy were outlawed in Iceland for more than three centuries.

Revival

The Catholic Church established on 8 December 1855 a jurisdiction under the name Apostolic Prefecture of the North Pole (Praefectura Apostolica Poli Arctici) that included Iceland. Several years later, the two French priests Bernard Bernard (1821-1895) and Jean-Baptiste Baudoin (1831-1875) settled in Iceland in 1857 and 1858 respectively. They met with a difficult reception and in 1862, Bernard left the country, while Baudoin persevered until 1875. On 17 August 1869 Pope Pius IX set up an  Apostolic Prefecture of Denmark, which now included Iceland. Freedom of worship was enacted in 1874. After an interval, Catholic missionary efforts were resumed, with by the turn of the century a church, a school and even a hospital run by nuns.

The former jurisdiction became an Apostolic Vicariate of Denmark on 15 March 1892. Thereafter, the island territory became for the Catholic Church an independent unit, first as the Apostolic Prefecture of Iceland on 23 June 1923 and then, not many years later, on 6 June 1929, as the Apostolic Vicariate of Iceland. It was on 18 October 1968 that this entity matured into the Diocese of Reykjavík. Even though the Catholic population remains small, both as a percentage of the overall population and in absolute numbers, it grew from about 450 in 1950 to 5,590 in 2004, during which time the total population grew from 140,000 to 290,000.

In the twentieth century Iceland had some notable, if at times temporary, converts to the Catholic faith. For a time Halldór Laxness was a Catholic. Although this did not last, his Catholic period is of importance due to his position in modern Icelandic literature. A more consistently Catholic writer in Icelandic was Jón Sveinsson. He moved to France at the age of 13 and became a Jesuit. He remained in the Society of Jesus for the rest of his life. He was well liked as a children's book author (though he did not write in Icelandic) and he even appeared on an Icelandic postage stamp.  In 1989 Pope John Paul II visited Iceland.

Today, the number of Catholics in Iceland, a predominantly Protestant country, comprises just under 3.81% of the population, and form the third largest denomination in the country. The Diocese of Reykjavík covers the whole of Iceland.  There is a Christ the King Cathedral (Dómkirkja Krists Konungs) in Reykjavík and a number of smaller churches and chapels in the larger towns. The Bishop of Reykjavík participates in the Scandinavian Bishops Conference. Many of the Catholics are Eastern European and Filipino immigrants; if they are excluded, Catholics are about 1% of the population, the figure before immigrants started coming in large numbers.

On 17 June 2017 a new Catholic Church was consecrated in Reyðarfjörður in a ceremony led by Bishop Tencer. The church building was a gift from the Slovak Catholic Church. The church was built from wood in Slovakia, disassembled and shipped to Reyðarfjörður where it was re-assembled. Robert Fico, the Prime Minister of Slovakia, attended the consecration.

See also
Ancient Diocese of the Faroe Islands  
Bishop of Orkney  
Bishop of Reykjavík (Catholic)    
Garðar, Greenland (list of Bishops of Garðar)  
Landakotskirkja (Christ the King Cathedral, Reykjavík, Iceland)  
List of Hólar bishops  
List of Skálholt bishops   
Religion in Iceland

Footnotes

External links
Catholic Diocese of Reykjavík 
Iceland in Catholic Hierarchy 

 
Iceland
Iceland